The Division of Deakin is an Australian Electoral Division in Victoria.

Geography
Since 1984, federal electoral division boundaries in Australia have been determined at redistributions by a redistribution committee appointed by the Australian Electoral Commission. Redistributions occur for the boundaries of divisions in a particular state, and they occur every seven years, or sooner if a state's representation entitlement changes or when divisions of a state are malapportioned.

History

The division was created in 1937, and was named in honour of Alfred Deakin, who served as Prime Minister of Australia on three non-consecutive occasions from 1903 to 1910. Deakin had represented the Victorian federal seat of Ballarat from 1901 to 1913.

Initially a rural seat, the division has been located in the eastern suburbs of Melbourne since 1949, today taking in Bayswater North, Croydon, Croydon North, Croydon South, East Ringwood, Heatherdale, Heathmont, Kilsyth South, Mitcham,  Ringwood, Vermont and Vermont South; it also covers parts of Croydon Hills, Forest Hill, Kilsyth, North Ringwood, Nunawading and Park Orchards. Vermont South includes Pin Oak Court, the cul-de-sac used as the filming location for Ramsay Street in the television soap opera Neighbours. Also part of the division's boundaries are the nearby Nunawading Studios, where other scenes for the show have been shot.

Deakin has usually been held by the Liberal Party, though it became increasingly marginal from the 1980s onward. Prior to the 2013 federal election it was the second most marginal Labor Party seat in Australia. At the 2013 federal election, Michael Sukkar reclaimed the seat for the Liberal Party and was elected with 53.2% of the two-party-preferred vote.

Members

Election results

References

External links
 Division of Deakin - Australian Electoral Commission

Electoral divisions of Australia
Constituencies established in 1937
1937 establishments in Australia
City of Maroondah
City of Whitehorse
Electoral districts and divisions of Greater Melbourne
Ringwood, Victoria